Pseudogracilibacillus endophyticus is a Gram-positive, bacterium from the genus of Pseudogracilibacillus which has been isolated from the roots of the plant Oenothera biennis.

References

 

Bacillaceae
Bacteria described in 2018